was a  after Nin'an and before Jōan. This period spanned the years from April 1169 through April 1171.

Change of era
 January 30, 1169 : The new era name was created to mark an event or series of events. The previous era ended and a new one commenced in Nin'an 4, on the 8th day of the 4th month of 1169.

Events of the Kaō era
 1169 (Kaō 1, 3rd month): The former-Emperor Go-Shirakawa made a pilgrimage to Mont Koya.
 1169 (Kaō 1, 6th month): Go-Shirakawa accepted tonsure as a Buddhist priest; and he took the title Hōō.
 1169 (Kaō 1, 12th month): The chūnagon Fujiwara no Nurisika was banished to Bingo province as a consequence of complaints of Buddhist priests from Mt. Hiei; but shortly thereafter, he was recalled to Heian-kyō because of past services to Emperor Go-Shirakawa.

References
Specific

General
 Brown, Delmer M. and Ichirō Ishida, eds. (1979).  Gukanshō: The Future and the Past. Berkeley: University of California Press. ;  OCLC 251325323
 Nussbaum, Louis-Frédéric and Käthe Roth. (2005).  Japan encyclopedia. Cambridge: Harvard University Press. ;  OCLC 58053128
 Titsingh, Isaac. (1834). Nihon Odai Ichiran; ou,  Annales des empereurs du Japon.  Paris: Royal Asiatic Society, Oriental Translation Fund of Great Britain and Ireland. OCLC 5850691
 Varley, H. Paul. (1980). A Chronicle of Gods and Sovereigns: Jinnō Shōtōki of Kitabatake Chikafusa. New York: Columbia University Press. ;  OCLC 6042764

External links 
 National Diet Library, "The Japanese Calendar" -- historical overview plus illustrative images from library's collection

Japanese eras
1160s in Japan
1170s in Japan